Richard Grosvenor may refer to:

Sir Richard Grosvenor, 1st Baronet (1585–1645)
Sir Richard Grosvenor, 2nd Baronet (c.1604–1665)
Sir Richard Grosvenor, 4th Baronet (1693–1732)
Richard Grosvenor, 1st Earl Grosvenor (1731–1802)
Richard Grosvenor, 2nd Marquess of Westminster (1795–1869)
Richard Grosvenor, 1st Baron Stalbridge (1837–1912)